is a former Japanese football player.

Club statistics

References

External links

1987 births
Living people
University of Tsukuba alumni
Association football people from Kumamoto Prefecture
Japanese footballers
J2 League players
Mito HollyHock players
Association football midfielders